This is a list of films which placed number one at the weekend box office for the year 2014.

Number-one films

Highest-grossing films

Calendar Gross
Highest-grossing films of 2014 by Calendar Gross

In-Year Release

See also
 List of American films – American films by year
 List of box office number-one films

Notes

References

Chronology

2014
2014 in American cinema
United States